Keep On Running or Keep On Runnin' may refer to:

Music
 "Keep On Running" (The Real Milli Vanilli song), 1990
 "Keep On Running" (Jackie Edwards song), 1965
 "Keep On Running", a song by Stevie Wonder from Music of My Mind
 "Keep On Running", a song by Vanden Plas
 "Keep On Runnin'", a song by the band Journey from Escape
 "Keep On Runnin' (Crawlin' Black Spider)", a song by Cat Power (interpolating a song by John Lee Hooker) from You Are Free
 Keep On Running, original title of The Real Milli Vanilli album The Moment of Truth

Television
 "Keep On Running" (The Green Green Grass), a 2005 episode of The Green Green Grass